The Fan-bearer on the Right Side of the King – sometimes also translated as Fanbearer on the King's Right Hand – was an ancient Egyptian courtier.

The title implies a very close personal or official relationship with the pharaoh. During the times of Amenhotep II and Tuthmosis IV the title was held by officials like the viceroy of Kush, the chief steward of the king, and several tutors, such as Sennedjem under Tutankhamun. Scenes depicting the fan-bearers show them holding a long fan with a single feather. Other important title holders include Maiherpri, who was buried in the Valley of the Kings.

See also
Flabellum

References